Camaegeria sylvestralis is a moth of the family Sesiidae. It is known from eastern Madagascar.

Both pairs of wings are completely hyaline.
This species is close to Camaegeria xanthomos and Camaegeria polytelis from which it can be distinguished by the abdomen that is dorsally completely red.

References

Sesiidae
Moths described in 1955
Moths of Madagascar
Moths of Africa